Poland existed as a state for the first time in over a hundred years with the proclamation of the Second Polish Republic in 1918. This state lasted until Poland was invaded and partitioned by Nazi Germany and the Soviet Union in the fall of 1939.

1910s 
Corka Pani X (1919)

1920s 
The Jews in Poland (1920)
Pan Twardowski (1921) – directed by Wiktor Biegański
Uroda zycia (1921) – directed by Eugeniusz Modzelewski and William Wauer
Otchlan pokuty (1922) – directed by Wiktor Biegański
Strzal (1922) – directed by Danny Kaden, Władysław Lenczewski
Tajemnica przystanku tramwajowego (1922) – directed by Leon Trystan
Zazdrosc (1922) – directed by Wiktor Biegański
The Idol (1923) – directed by Wiktor Biegański
Niewolnica milosci (1923) – directed by Jan Kucharski, Stanislaw Szebego and Adam Zagórski
Tkies khaf (1924) (in Yiddish) – directed by Zygmund Turkow
Iwonka (1925) – directed by Emil Chaberski
Czerwony blazen (1926) – directed by Henryk Szaro
Tredowata (1926) – directed by Boleslaw Mierzejewski and Edvard Pukhalsky
Bunt krwi i zelaza (1927) – directed by Leon Trystan
Kochanka Szamoty (1927) – directed by Leon Trystan
Orle (1927) – directed by Wiktor Biegański
Ziemia obiecana (1927) – directed by Zygmund Turkow and Aleksander Hertz
Dzikuska (1928) – directed by Henryk Szaro
Huragan (1928) – directed by Joseph Lejtes
Kropka nad i (1928) – directed by Juliusz Gardan
Liebeshölle (1928) – directed by Wiktor Biegański
Pan Tadeusz (1928)- directed by Ryszard Ordynski
Przedwiosnie (1928) – directed by Henryk Szaro
Szalency (1928) – directed by Leonard Buczkowski
Kult ciala (1929) – directed by Michał Waszyński
Mocny czlowiek (1929) – directed by Henryk Szaro
Nad Radem (1929) – directed by Aleksander Ford

1930s

1930–1934
Exile to Siberia (1930) – directed by Henryk Szaro
Gwiazdzista eskadra (1930) – directed by Leonard Buczkowski (lost film)
Janko Muzykant (1930) – directed by Ryszard Ordynski
Mascotte (1930) – directed by Aleksander Ford
Narodziny gazety (1930) – directed by Aleksander Ford
Niebezpieczny romans (1930) – directed by Michał Waszyński
Tetno Polskiego Manchestern (1930) – directed by Aleksander Ford
Cham (1931) – directed by Jan Nowina-Przybylski
Dziś mamy bal (1931) – directed by Jerzy Zarzycki
Tytoniówka (1931) – directed by Jerzy Zarzycki
Uwiedziona (1931) – directed by Michał Waszyński
Bezimienni bohaterowie (1932) – directed by Michał Waszyński
Dziesięciu z Pawiaka (1932) – directed by Ryszard Ordynski
Głos pustyni (1932)- directed by Michał Waszyński
Halutzim (1932)- directed by Aleksander Ford
Księżna Łowicka (Noc listopadowa) (1932) – directed by Mieczysław Krawicz and Janusz Warnecki
Legion ulicy (1932) – directed by Aleksander Ford
Morze (1932) – directed by Wanda Jakubowska, Stanislaw Wohl and Jerzy Zarzycki
Reportaż nr 2 (1932) – directed by Jerzy Zarzycki
Sto metrów miłosci (1932) – directed by Michał Waszyński
Szyb L23 (1932) – directed by Leonard Buczkowski
Dzieje grzechu (1933) – directed by Henryk Szaro
Dziesięć procent dla mnie (1933) – directed by Juliusz Gardan
Jego ekscelencja subiekt (1933) – directed by Michał Waszyński
Każdemu wolno kochać (1933) – directed by Mieczysław Krawicz and Janusz Warnecki
Prokurator Alicja Horn (1933) – directed by Michał Waszyński
Romeo i Julcia (1933) – directed by Jan Nowina-Przybylski
Ułan i dziewczyna (1933) – directed by Henryk Szaro
Wyrok życia (1933) – directed by Juliusz Gardan
Zabawka (1933) – directed by Michał Waszyński
Szpieg w masce (1933) – directed by Mieczysław Krawicz
Budujemy (1934) – directed by Wanda Jakubowska
Czarna perła (1934) – directed by Michał Waszyński
Czy Lucyna to dziewczyna (1934) – directed by Juliusz Gardan
Córka generała Pankratowa (1934) – directed by Mieczyslaw Znamierowski
Kocha, lubi, szanuje (1934) – directed by Michał Waszyński
Młody las (1934) – directed by Joseph Lejtes
Parada rezerwistów (1934) – directed by Michał Waszyński
Piesniarz Warszawy (1934) – directed by Michał Waszyński
Przebudzenie (1934) – directed by Aleksander Ford, Wanda Jakubowska and Jan Nowina-Przybylski
Przybłęda (1934) – directed by Jan Nowina-Przybylski and Jan Rogozinski
Śluby ułańskie (1934) – directed by Mieczysław Krawicz
Świt, dzień i noc Palestyny (1934) – directed by Henryk Bojm
Co mój mąż robi w nocy (1934) – directed by Michał Waszyński

1935–1939
ABC miłości (1935) – directed by Michał Waszyński
Al Chet (1935)  – directed by Alexander Marten
Antek policmajster (1935) directed by Michał Waszyński
Dwie Joasie (1935) – directed by Mieczysław Krawicz
Dzień wielkiej przygody (1935) – directed by Joseph Lejtes
Jaśnie pan szofer (1935) – directed by Michał Waszyński
Jego wielka miłość (1935) – directed by Mieczysław Krawicz
Kochaj tylko mnie (1935) – directed by Marta Flantz
Manewry miłosne (1935) – directed by Jan Nowina-Przybylski and Konrad Tom
Nie miała baba kłopotu (1935) – directed by Michał Waszyński and Aleksander Ford
Panienka z poste-restante (1935) – directed by Michał Waszyński
Pogrzeb Marszalka Józefa Pilsudskiego 12-V-18-V 1935 (1935) (documentary of Józef Pilsudski funeral)
Rapsodia Bałtyku (1935)- directed by Leonard Buczkowski, Jakub Orlowski and Aleksander Pekalski
Wacuś (1935)- directed by Michał Waszyński

1936 
30 karatów szczęścia (1936) – directed by Michał Waszyński
Ada! To nie wypada! (1936) – directed by Konrad Tom
Amerykańska awantura (1936) – directed by Ryszard Ordynski
Bohaterowie Sybiru (1936) – directed by Michał Waszyński
Bolek i Lolek (1936) – directed by Michał Waszyński
Dodek na froncie (1936) – directed by Michał Waszyński
Droga młodych (1936) (in Yiddish) – directed by Aleksander Ford
Dwa dni w raju (1936) – directed by Leon Trystan
Fredek uszczesliwia swiat (1936) – directed by Zbigniew Ziembinski
Jadzia (1936) – directed by Mieczysław Krawicz
Miłość wszystko zwycięża (1936)
Pan Twardowski (1936) – directed by Henryk Szaro
Papa sie żeni (1936) – directed by Michał Waszyński
Róża (1936) – directed by Joseph Lejtes
Straszny dwór (1936) – directed by Leonard Buczkowski
Tajemnica panny Brinx (1936) – directed by Bazyli Sikiewicz
Trędowata (1936) – directed by Juliusz Gardan
Wacek na froncie (1936) – directed by Leonard Buczkowski
Wierna rzeka (1936) – directed by Leonard Buczkowski
Barbara Radziwiłłówna (1936) – directed by Joseph Lejtes
Będzie lepiej (1936) – directed by Michał Waszyński
Yidl Mitn Fidl (1936) – directed by Joseph Green and Jan Nowina-Przybylski

1937 
Dorożkarz nr. 13 (1937) – directed by Marian Czauski
Dyplomatyczna żona (1937) – directed by Carl Boese and Mieczysław Krawicz
Dziewczęta z Nowolipek (1937) – directed by Joseph Lejtes
Halka (1937) – directed by Juliusz Gardan
Królowa przedmiescia (1937) – directed by Eugeniusz Bodo
Ksiazatko (1937) – directed by Stanislaw Szebego and Konrad Tom
Niedorajda (1937) – directed by Mieczysław Krawicz
O czym marza kobiety (1937) – directed by Alexander Marten
Ordynat Michorowski (1937) – directed by Henryk Szaro
Pan redaktor szaleje (1937) – directed by Jan Nowina-Przybylski
Pani minister tanczy (1937) – directed by Juliusz Gardan
Parada Warszawy (1937) – directed by Hanka Ordonówna and Konrad Tom
Płomienne serca (1937) – directed by Romuald Gantkowski
Skłamałam (1937) – directed by Mieczysław Krawicz
Sztandar Wolnosci (1937)
Tkies Khaf (1937) (in Yiddish) – directed by Henryk Szaro
Trójka hultajska (1937) – directed by Henryk Szaro
Ty co w ostrej swiecisz bramie (1937) – directed by Jan Nowina-Przybylski
Ulica Edisony (1937) – directed by Wanda Jakubowska
Weseli biedacy (1937) (in Yiddish) – directed by Leon Jeannot
Znachor (1937) – directed by Michał Waszyński
Dybuk (1937) (in Yiddish) – directed by Michał Waszyński
The Jester  (1937) (in Yiddish) – directed by Joseph Green and Jan Nowina-Przybylski

1938 

Krwawa rosa (1938)
Moi rodzice rozwodza sie (1938) – directed by Mieczysław Krawicz
Ostatnia brygada (1938) – directed by Michał Waszyński
Pawel i Gawel (1938) – directed by Mieczysław Krawicz
Profesor Wilczur (1938) – directed by Michał Waszyński
Robert and Bertram (1938) – directed by Mieczysław Krawicz
Serce matki (1938) – directed by Michał Waszyński
Strachy (1938) – directed by Eugeniusz Cekalski and Karol Szolowski
Sygnały (film) (1938) – directed by Joseph Lejtes
Szczęśliwa 13-ka (1938) – directed by Marian Czauski
Ułan księcia Józefa (1938) – directed by Konrad Tom
Wrzos (1938) – directed by Juliusz Gardan
Piętro wyżej (1938) – directed by Leon Trystan
Zapomniana melodia (1938) – directed by Jan Fethke and Konrad Tom

Polish films released during the war 

Interwar Period, made in Poland
Poland Interwar Period